Kelvin Natural Slush Co. is a New York-based food truck company specializing in slush drinks.

History
The company was started by Zack Silverman and Alex Rein. The business was named after the Kelvin temperature scale. Their success has led to their slushes being sold at Madison Square Garden and at selected Whole Foods Market stores.

Awards and recognitions
The company was awarded "Best Dessert Truck" by the Vendy Awards.

See also
 List of food trucks

References

External links
Official Website
Mobile Food Carts

Food production companies based in New York City
Restaurants established in 2010
Food trucks